MicroP2 is a memory card format introduced by Panasonic. 

The cards were announced in April 2012 and shipped in March 2013.
Physically, MicroP2 is a SDXC/SDHC card conforming to UHS-II (Ultra High Speed bus), and can be read by common SDHC/SDXC card readers.

It can be used with P2 products using an adapter, though a firmware update is required to use the new media. 

The first MicroP2 products from Panasonic shipped in April 2013.

References

Panasonic products